Kate Mundt (9 January 1930 – 5 May 2004) was a Danish film actress. She appeared in 20 films between 1951 and 1978. She was born and died in Denmark.

Filmography

 Agent 69 Jensen i Skyttens tegn (1978)
 Agent 69 Jensen i Skorpionens tegn (1977)
 Hopla på sengekanten (1976)
 I Tvillingernes tegn (1975)
 Justine och Juliette (1975)
 I Tyrens tegn (1974)
 Romantik på sengekanten (1973)
 Tandlæge på sengekanten (1971)
 Rend mig i revolutionen (1970)
 Ta' lidt solskin (1969)
 Jag en kvinna, II - äktenskapet (1968)
 Der kom en dag (1955)
 Kongeligt besøg (1954)
 Sønnen (1953)
 Ved kongelunden... (1953)
 Kampen mod tuberkulosen (1953)
 Rekrut 67, Petersen (1952)
 Unge piger forsvinder i København (1951)
 Glem det aldrig (1951)

References

External links

1930 births
2004 deaths
Danish film actresses
20th-century Danish actresses